Viderup Castle is a manor house in Eslöv Municipality, Scania,  Sweden. The main building has two floors together with two one-storey wings, surrounds a courtyard that is open to the north.

History
Viderup manor (former spelling Hviderup)  was built in Renaissance style during the early 17th century by Anne Brahe  (1576-1635), widow of Steen Maltesen Sehested (1553-1611), Danish Marshal of the Realm   (rigsmarsk) and commander of  Froste Herred in Scania.

See also
List of castles in Sweden

References  

Manor houses in Sweden
Castles in Skåne County